Jodis is a genus of moths in the family Geometridae.

Species
 Jodis albipuncta Warren, 1898
 Jodis amamiensis Inoue, 1982
 Jodis api Holloway, 1996
 Jodis argentilineata (Wileman, 1916)
 Jodis argutaria (Walker, 1866)
 Jodis coeruleata Warren, 1896
 Jodis colpostrophia Prout, 1917
 Jodis ctila Prout, 1926
 Jodis delicatula Warren, 1896
 Jodis dentifascia Warren, 1897
 Jodis fulgurata (Debauche, 1941)
 Jodis inumbrata Warren, 1896
 Jodis irregularis (Warren, 1894)
 Jodis kojii Yazaki, 1995
 Jodis lactearia (Linnaeus, 1758)
 Jodis lara Prout, 1926
 Jodis nanda (Walker, 1861)
 Jodis nepalica Inoue, 1987
 Jodis nitida Lucas, 1892
 Jodis niveovenata Oberthur, 1916
 Jodis orientalis Wehrli, 1923 (= Jodis angulata Inoue, 1961)
 Jodis pallescens (Hampson, 1891)
 Jodis placida Inoue, 1986
 Jodis praerupta (Butler, 1878)
 Jodis putata (Linnaeus, 1758)
 Jodis rantaizanensis (Wileman, 1916)
 Jodis rectisecta Herbulot, 1985
 Jodis rhabdota Prout, 1917
 Jodis spumifera Warren, 1898
 Jodis subtractata (Walker, 1863)
 Jodis tibetana Chu, 1982
 Jodis undularia (Hampson, 1891)
 Jodis urosticta Prout, 1930
 Jodis vicaria (Herbulot, 1985)
 Jodis xynia Prout, 1917

References
Natural History Museum Lepidoptera genus database

Hemitheini